Rubba Band Business is the fourth studio album by American rapper Juicy J, released on December 8, 2017, by Kemosabe Records, Columbia Records and Taylor Gang Records. It features guest appearances from Travis Scott, ASAP Rocky, Ty Dolla Sign, and Offset, among others. The album was preceded by three singles: "No English", "Ain't Nothing" and "Flood Watch".

Background
The album was announced in August 2016. The album's tracklist and release date was revealed on November 13, 2017.

Singles
The album's lead single, "No English" featuring Travis Scott was released on June 17, 2016. The second single, "Ain't Nothing" featuring Wiz Khalifa and Ty Dolla Sign was released on February 3, 2017. The third single, "Flood Watch" featuring Offset was released on August 4, 2017.

Track listing
Credits adapted from the album's liner notes.

Personnel
Credits adapted from the album's liner notes.

Performers
 Juicy J – primary artist
 Project Pat – featured artist 
 ASAP Rocky – featured artist 
 G.O.D. – featured artist 
 Wiz Khalifa – featured artist 
 Denzel Curry – featured artist 
 Ty Dolla Sign – featured artist 
 Offset – featured artist 
 Travis Scott – featured artist 
 Tory Lanez – featured artist 
 Belly – featured artist 

Technical
 Crazy Mike – recording engineer 
 Kevin Nix – mastering engineer 
 Hector Delgado – recording engineer 
 Alex Tumay – mixing engineer 
 Gordie Tumay – assistant mixing engineer 
 Eric Dan – mixing engineer 
 Resource – recording engineer 
 Jaycen Joshua – mixing engineer 
 Maddox Chhim – assistant mixing engineer 
 Jordan Lewis – recording engineer 
 David Nakaji – assistant mixing engineer 

Production
 Metro Boomin – producer 
 G Koop – producer 
 Tarentino – producer 
 Lex Luger – producer 
 YK808 – producer 
 Murda Beatz – producer 
 Mike Will Made It – producer 
 Resource – producer 
 TM88 – producer 
 Deedotwill – producer 
 Ben Billions – producer 
 DannyBoyStyles – producer 
 R. City – producer 

Additional personnel
 Juicy J – executive producer
 Wiz Khalifa – executive producer
 April Pope – marketing
 ASAP Rocky – art direction and design
 Robert Gallardo – art direction and design
 Niko Nice – art direction and design
 Awol Erizku – photography
 Sammy K – styling

Charts

References

	

2017 albums
Juicy J albums
Epic Records albums
Kemosabe Records albums
Albums produced by Metro Boomin
Albums produced by Lex Luger
Albums produced by Murda Beatz
Albums produced by Mike Will Made It
Albums produced by TM88